Chmielnik  is a village in Rzeszów County, Subcarpathian Voivodeship, in south-eastern Poland. It is the seat of the gmina (administrative district) called Gmina Chmielnik.

The village has a population of 3,466.

References

Chmielnik